The 1982 San Jose State Spartans football team represented San Jose State University during the 1982 NCAA Division I-A football season as a member of the Pacific Coast Athletic Association. The team was led by head coach Jack Elway, in his fourth year at San Jose State. They played home games at Spartan Stadium in San Jose, California. The Spartans finished the 1982 season with a record of eight wins and three losses (8–3, 4–2 PCAA).

Schedule

Team Players in the NFL
The following were selected in the 1983 NFL Draft.

The following finished their college career in 1982, were not drafted, but played in the NFL.

Notes

References

San Jose State
San Jose State Spartans football seasons
San Jose State Spartans football